Sir William Bagge, 1st Baronet (17 June 1810 – 12 February 1880) was a Conservative Party politician in the United Kingdom. He was Member of Parliament (MP) for West Norfolk from 1837 to 1857, and from 1865 to 1880.  He was made a baronet in 1867, of Stradsett Hall, in the County of Norfolk.

He was the son of Thomas Philip Bagge and Grace Salisbury, from whom he inherited Stradsett Hall, a large mansion in the parish of Stradsett, near Downham Market in west Norfolk.

He married Frances Preston, with whom he had six children: four daughters, followed by two sons, William (Sir William Bagge, 2nd Baronet) and Thomas (Sir Thomas Bagge, 3rd Baronet). Bagge was succeeded by his first son, William, in the baronetcy, but he died childless a year later and was succeeded by his younger brother, Sir Alfred Thomas Bagge, 3rd Baronet.

Between 1836 and 1839, Bagge played in four first-class cricket matches for Norfolk and MCC, scoring seven runs, holding two catches and taking one wicket.

References

External links 
 

1810 births
1880 deaths
Baronets in the Baronetage of the United Kingdom
Conservative Party (UK) MPs for English constituencies
People from King's Lynn and West Norfolk (district)
UK MPs 1837–1841
UK MPs 1841–1847
UK MPs 1847–1852
UK MPs 1852–1857
UK MPs 1865–1868
UK MPs 1868–1874
UK MPs 1874–1880
English cricketers
English cricketers of 1826 to 1863
Norfolk cricketers
Marylebone Cricket Club cricketers
Sportspeople from Norfolk
Twin sportspeople